is a Japanese actor best known as the shōguns ninja Saizō in the long-running prime-time television jidaigeki Abarenbō Shōgun. Godai first appeared as Saizō in Episode 57 of Series III, and continued through Series IV and V, about 190 episodes.

His stage name is the name of the character portrayed by Yujiro Ishihara in the 1969 film Eiko e no 5,000 kiro.

He is also a voice actor. He has had important roles in Taiyo Sentai Sun Vulcan, and as the villain Akudaikaan in Futari wa Pretty Cure Splash Star.

In film, Godai played the male lead opposite Rina Akiyama in the 2006 horror film Eko eko azaraku: B-page. He appeared in the 1985 Shiosai, an adaptation of The Sound of Waves by Yukio Mishima. He also played a role in Moonlight Mask (the 1981 movie version).

Godai appeared live on stage at a special performance Koi densetsu: Ai sureba koso by Yōko Nagayama.

Tokusatsu

Engine Sentai Go-onger (Savage Land Barbaric Machine Beast Nokogiri Banki/Chainsaw Banki)

References

External links 
 

1956 births
Living people
Japanese male actors